The Bulgaria national football team represents Bulgaria in men's international football and is administered by the Bulgarian Football Union, a member association of UEFA.

Bulgaria's best achievements are reaching the final at the 1968 Summer Olympics and the fourth place finish at the FIFA World Cup in 1994. Bulgaria have competed at a total of seven World Cups, debuting in 1962 and last appearing in 1998. In addition, they have participated in two European Championships, in 1996 and 2004. The team has also competed at the Balkan Cup, winning three titles. However, Bulgaria have failed to qualify for any major tournament since UEFA Euro 2004.

History

Early history
The Bulgarian national football team was formed in 1922. In 1923, the Bulgarian Football Union was formed and the team's first match was held in Vienna on 21 May 1924, which resulted in a 6–0 defeat against Austria. Bulgaria also participated in the 1924 Summer Olympics in Paris a few days later.

Years of international wilderness
After being unable to compete in the 1930 World Cup, the Bulgarian side did not qualify for any major tournament for nearly 30 years, narrowly falling short of qualification on numerous occasions. The national team had gone on a streak of finishing 2nd or 3rd in their qualifying groups along with proceeding to the play-offs, but in the end, failing to qualify. Despite their qualifying problems, the national team did manage to defeat many elite teams during memorable international friendlies during those years. It also seemed as if the only tournaments they managed to qualify for were smaller tournaments, such as the Balkan Cup, which they won three times (1931, 1932 and 1973–76), thus being the competition's second most successful team only behind Romania with four titles.

1960s and 1970s

Bulgaria qualified for the World Cup for the first time in its history in 1962 and followed that up with consecutive appearances in 1966, 1970 and 1974. The team, however, did not have much success and finished in third place in their group two out of the four times.

Bulgaria took part in qualifiers for the European Championship in 1968 and went on to win their group with impressive wins over Norway, Sweden, and Portugal. Although they would go on to lose to the eventual champions and hosts Italy in a two-legged qualifying play-off.

At the 1968 Summer Olympics, the team won the silver medal. They finished first in Group D by defeating Thailand 7–0, Guatemala 2–1, and drawing 2–2 against Czechoslovakia. They advanced to the quarter-finals by defeating Israel and then the semi-finals by defeating favored hosts Mexico. In the Olympic Final, the team was defeated by Hungary, in what many would say was a hard-fought match for both sides.

Despite winning the Balkan Cup twice in 1931 and 1932, the Bulgaria national team added two more trophies to their case as they went on to win the tournament in 1973 and 1976. In both 1973 and 1976, Bulgaria had used their previous World Cup experience to create a very tactical team. This paid off quite well, as they had many decisive victories over Hungary, Greece, Turkey, Yugoslavia, Poland, Albania and Romania. In fact, the team won the 1976 Balkan Cup by beating Romania in the two-legged final 1–0 and 3–2.

1962 World Cup
Bulgaria finally qualified for their first world cup. Bulgaria was drawn in a tough group with elite opponents in England, powerhouse Argentina and Hungary. Bulgaria opened up their campaign with a narrow 0–1 loss to Argentina. Later on, Bulgaria would lose their second group match by a 6–1 score to Hungary. Bulgaria's hopes of qualifying were over, but the national team impressively drew with future 1966 World Cup champions England 0-0 and finished fourth in the group with only one point.

1966 World Cup
Bulgaria qualified for their second straight World Cup, drawn into an even tougher group compared to the previous World Cup. They were placed in the group of death with superpowers Hungary, Portugal and Brazil, with Pelé at the helm. Bulgaria opened their campaign match with a 0–2 loss to Brazil thanks to two free kick goals by Pelé and Garrincha. In their second match Bulgaria loss 0–3 to Eusebio's Portugal. Finally, Bulgaria with no chance of advancing to the next round, finished their last match with a 1–3 loss to Hungary. Bulgaria once again finished fourth with zero points in the group.

Euro 1968 qualification
After their poor World Cup performance, Bulgaria was determined to redeem themselves. Bulgaria was drawn in a very tough group for qualifying, with Norway and Sweden, along with Eusebio's Portugal. Bulgaria started off with a 4–2 win over Norway. They would add to their winning streak with a 2–0 victory against Sweden. In their next two matches Bulgaria would draw 0–0 against Norway, and dominate Sweden 3–0. In their final two group fixtures Bulgaria played Portugal to a 1–0 victory at home and an 0–0 draw on the road, but it was enough to advance to the two-legged qualifying play-off. There Bulgaria were drawn against eventual Euro 1968 host Italy. Italy were defeated in the first leg 3–2, but won the second by a 0–2 score to advance 4–3 on aggregate. Italy would win the playoff and go on to win the tournament, while Bulgaria was eliminated from reaching the finals.

1968 Summer Olympics
A month and a half after the European Championship qualifying came the Olympics, which Bulgaria had qualified for the fifth time in their history. They were drawn in a simple group with Thailand, Guatemala and Czechoslovakia. Bulgaria started off with a 7–0 thrashing of Thailand.  They later went on and drew with Czechoslovakia 2–2 to increase their point standards.  Their final match once again determined if they would carry on to the quarter-finals. Needing a decisive win, Bulgaria went on to defeat Guatemala 2–1 and win their Olympic group. They qualified directly to the quarter-finals facing underdogs, Israel.  The game remained 1–1 for most of the match until a drawing of lots determined who would go on to the semi-finals of the tournament. Winning the draw Bulgaria advanced to the semi-finals against Mexico. After a very hard-fought match, Bulgaria proved stronger as they came out on top with a 3–2 victory.  Bulgaria advanced to the finals for the first time in their Olympic history. They were determined to win the gold medal, but fell short with a 1–4 loss to Hungary.  Although battling hard, Bulgaria came out with the silver medal.

1970 World Cup
Bulgaria qualified for their third straight World Cup, held in Mexico, just like the 1968 Olympics. They were drawn in a very tricky group with Germany, Peru and Morocco. Bulgaria played their first match against Peru, losing 3–2. Germany won Bulgaria's second match, 5–2. The last group stage match ended 1–1; Bulgaria ended up in 3rd place.

1974 World Cup
The 1974 World Cup was held in West Germany. They were drawn in a decently tough group, with the Netherlands, Sweden and Uruguay.  Bulgaria started off with a goalless draw with Sweden. They drew again, this time 1–1 with Uruguay. As the final match came, Bulgaria fell by a 4–1 score. Bulgaria remained in third place in the group stages.

1986 World Cup
Bulgaria qualified for the 1986 World Cup in Mexico by finishing second in Group Four, behind France with 11 points, but ahead of powerful rivals Yugoslavia and East Germany. This was their fifth World Cup appearance. They were drawn in Group A with Italy, Argentina, and South Korea. In the opening match of the World Cup, the Bulgarians held the defending champions Italy to an impressive 1–1 draw. Alessandro Altobelli gave the Italians the lead, but an 85th-minute equalizer by Nasko Sirakov gave the Bulgarians the point they needed. The next match was another 1–1 draw against South Korea with the goal for Bulgaria coming from Plamen Getov in the 11th minute. They lost the final match of the group 2–0 against Argentina, who eventually won the tournament. Despite not recording a win, the Bulgarians advanced to the knockout stage by being the third-best third-placed team. By doing so, Bulgaria along with Uruguay became the first nations to qualify for the knockout stage without winning a game in the first round. In the Round of 16, they faced World Cup hosts Mexico, who were looking for revenge due to their previous home Olympic semi-final loss to Bulgaria in Mexico City in 1968. The match was hard-fought from both sides of the scale but ultimately, Mexico came away with the 2–0 win.

1994 World Cup
Certainly one of the most important dates in Bulgarian football history is 17 November 1993, a date on which Emil Kostadinov scored a deciding goal in the 90th minute to beat France in Paris, allowing Bulgaria to qualify for the World Cup in the United States in 1994. Under the management of Dimitar Penev, the Bulgarians, led by players such as Hristo Stoichkov, Yordan Lechkov, and Krasimir Balakov, along with a multitude of other talented players remembered in Bulgaria as the "Golden Generation", made a strong impression by surprisingly reaching the semi-finals. They entered a very tough Group D with 1990 World Cup runners-up Argentina with Diego Maradona at the helm, African Nations Cup champions Nigeria, and Balkan rivals Greece. The first match ended with a 3–0 defeat to Nigeria. Despite the bad start, the team made quite a huge statement by winning 4–0 against their Greece and increasing their goal difference. Their third and final match came against Argentina. The powerful Bulgarian side came away with a shocking 2–0 victory. Going into injury-time, Argentina was leading the group. A 91st-minute strike from Nasko Sirakov, however, meant that they'd drop two places and finish third.

Bulgaria continued to the round of 16, where they faced Mexico. Stoichkov opened the scoring in the sixth minute with an incredible strike off a break away from outside the box, tallying his fourth goal. The match ended 1–1 and after no goals were scored in extra time, penalties decided which team would go through. Team captain Borislav Mihaylov saved the first three penalty kicks in a row, breaking the World Cup record. Bulgaria won 3–1 on penalties. In the quarter-finals, Bulgaria faced the defending world champions Germany. At the start of the match held in Giants Stadium in East Rutherford, New Jersey, the Bulgarians dominated impressively, hitting the post twice in the process, but eventually found themselves behind after Lothar Matthäus scored the opening goal for the Germans. The Bulgarians, however, managed to turn the game over with a swerving free kick by Hristo Stoichkov and a flying header by Yordan Lechkov, giving them a 2–1 win. In the semi-finals, they controversially lost 2–1 to Italy. Stoichkov scored Bulgaria's only goal in the first half to tally his seventh goal, which led the tournament. In the second half, Bulgaria were waved off on a non-penalty call in which an Italian defender had clearly committed a handball in the box, off a Kostadinov cross. Instead of playing in the final, it became a third place play-off. Bulgaria lost against Sweden 4–0, but the fourth-place finish was Bulgaria's best performance in history to that point.

Hristo Stoichkov was awarded the Golden Boot shared with Oleg Salenko as the top scorer in the tournament with his six goals. Krasimir Balakov was named in the 1994 World Cup Dream Team along with Stoichkov. Later on in December, Stoichkov was awarded the FIFA Ballon D'Or trophy for his great skill and leadership, becoming the first Bulgarian and third Barcelona player to win it in history.

Euro 1996
In 1996, the team qualified for the European Football Championship for the first time. They were drawn in Group B with France, Spain, and Romania. Bulgaria started with a 1–1 draw against the Spain. Stoichkov scored his second goal with a wonderful volley, ruled offside. Bulgaria defeated Romania 1–0 in the next group stage match. Stoichkov scored in the third minute. In the final group match, the Bulgarian side lost 3–1 against France; Stoichkov scored a free kick to give Bulgaria their only goal of the game, along with their only loss. At the same time, Spain defeated Romania 2–1, and Bulgaria were eliminated.

1998 World Cup
Bulgaria qualified for the 1998 World Cup in France by finishing first in Group 5, with decisive wins over Russia. They entered the competition with new manager Hristo Bonev. Bulgaria drew Spain, Nigeria, and Paraguay in Group D. The first match ended decently, in a goalless draw against eventual group runners up Paraguay. In the second match, the Bulgarians lost 1–0 for a second-straight World Cup to Nigeria. The final match ended with a 6–1 defeat to Spain. Following the bad results, Bulgaria finished fourth in the group, with only one point. This was the last World Cup appearance for Bulgaria.

Euro 2000 qualification
Bulgaria was drawn in a tough qualifying group with teams England, Sweden, and Poland. The campaign started slow with a draw and a defeat by Poland and Sweden. The most memorable match for Bulgaria in the group was the 1–1 draw against England, which was also the last match for Stoichkov before his international retirement.  Bulgaria finished fourth with eight points and failed to make the final stages of Euro 2000.

2002 World Cup qualification
Bulgaria was once again drawn into a tough group with Denmark and Czech Republic. The group was also the debut of Bulgaria's top scoring legend Dimitar Berbatov. Bulgaria won the matches against the weaker teams, but lost once and drew once with both Denmark and the Czech Republic. Bulgaria finished third with 17 points, three points behind second-placed Czech Republic, thus failing to make the World Cup in South Korea and Japan.

Euro 2004
Bulgaria managed to qualify for the Euro 2004 in Portugal by finishing first with wins over Croatia and Belgium. They drew Sweden, Italy, and Denmark in Group C. All three group stage matches ended up in losses for Bulgaria, with Martin Petrov being the team's lone scorer in the country's 1–2 loss to Italy.

2006 World Cup qualification
Bulgaria failed to qualify for the World Cup in Germany after a run of poor results. They tied with Sweden and Croatia the first run but lost the other meetings to the two sides. Although Berbatov scored many goals in the qualifiers including a last-minute equalizer against Croatia, Bulgaria still finished third in qualifying with 15 points.

2006 Kirin Cup
Bulgaria found themselves in a minor tournament in Japan known as the Kirin Cup. They started off well with a 2–1 victory over the hosts Japan. However, Bulgaria lost 5–1 to Scotland, the eventual cup champions. Bulgaria finished as the runners-up and received the silver medal.

Euro 2008 qualification
Group G of Euro 2008 qualification had Netherlands, Romania, and Bulgaria attempting to qualify for Euro 2008, hosted by Switzerland and Austria. Bulgaria performed well after a run of good results against Romania which gave them the first place. Bulgaria finished third in the group falling short on one point behind the Netherlands.

2010 World Cup qualification

Bulgaria were drawn against Italy and Ireland in qualifying in Group 8. Bulgaria started the campaign with a series of draws. Manager Plamen Markov was replaced by Stanimir Stoilov in January 2009. The Bulgarians then recorded their first wins of the group over Cyprus, Montenegro and Georgia. They finished in third place with 14 points, therefore failing to qualify to a play-off spot.

Euro 2012 qualification

Bulgaria were drawn in Group G along with England, Switzerland, Wales, and Montenegro. Bulgaria finished in last place in the group.

2014 World Cup qualification
In the qualification phase for the 2014 FIFA World Cup in Brazil, Bulgaria were placed in Group B together with the teams of Italy, Denmark, Czech Republic, Armenia and Malta. Under the guidance of former player Lyuboslav Penev as head coach, Bulgaria enjoyed a revival and some noteworthy performances in friendly matches before the start of the qualifying, including a 2–1 victory over 2010 World Cup runners-up Netherlands in Amsterdam. The qualifying began with a 2–2 draw against Euro 2012 runners-up Italy. Bulgaria then edged a tight match against Armenia, which ended 1–0. Next, Bulgaria drew 1–1 against Denmark. Four days later, Bulgaria earning a hard-fought 0–0 draw away to the Czech Republic. As a result, the team climbed from 96th in the FIFA World Rankings, their lowest position in history, to 40th in November 2012.

Penev's players hosted and defeated Malta 6–0 under heavy snowfall. Four days later, Bulgaria drew Denmark 1–1 in Copenhagen. This result left Bulgaria second in the group with 10 points, still undefeated. Bulgaria traveled to Italy, losing 1–0. After a series of poor results, Bulgaria ended up failing to qualify for Brazil 2014.

Euro 2016 qualification
Bulgaria were placed in a group with Italy, Croatia, Norway, Azerbaijan, and Malta. Bulgaria opened up their first match with a 2–1 victory over Azerbaijan. They were defeated 1–0 by Croatia, following another 2–1 defeat to Norway. To make it worse, Bulgaria drew with Malta 1–1 at home, which would cost manager Lyuboslav Penev his position. He was replaced by Ludogorets Razgrad manager Ivaylo Petev.

On his debut match, Petev's squad drew Romania 0-0; this later led to a 2–2 draw with Italy, which Bulgaria led until a last-minute Italian equalizer. Bulgaria defeated Malta 1–0 to edge two points ever closer to the third place playoff position. After a series of losses, Bulgaria failed to qualify for Euro 2016 in France despite a 2–0 defeat of Azerbaijan.

2018 World Cup qualification
Bulgaria were drawn in a strong World Cup qualification group with the Netherlands, France, Sweden, Belarus and Luxembourg. They began with a 4–3 win against Luxembourg at home. This was followed by heavy losses to France (4–1) and Sweden (3–0). 
In November 2016, the Lions beat Belarus in Sofia 1–0, and then put up one of their best performances in recent years, beating the Netherlands 2–0 to move into third place in the group. 
Bulgaria then beat the group leaders Sweden 3–2 in Sofia to move one point behind their opponents in the table. However, they lost the match against the Netherlands at the Amsterdam Arena 3–1. A 1–0 defeat at home to France and a 1–1 draw in Luxembourg ended their chances of qualifying.

Euro 2020 qualification and Nations League
Bulgaria were drawn in UEFA Nations League C with Norway, Slovenia and Cyprus. Bulgaria opened up the campaign with a 2–1 win over Slovenia and a clean sheet against Norway. The Norwegians eventually avenged their loss to Bulgaria, resulting in a tie for first place. Bulgaria eventually closed out the second round of games with two 1–1 draws against Slovenia and Cyprus, resulting in a second-place finish.

Bulgaria was drawn in Group A with England, Czech Republic, Montenegro and Kosovo. The team began the qualifying campaign with a 1–1 home draw against Montenegro and a 1–1 away draw to Kosovo while losing three major players due to injuries. They later carried on with two more losses which sparked the end of their group campaign. Despite finishing in fourth place, the national side had one more opportunity to qualify for the Euros thanks to the good performance in the Nations League. It sent Bulgaria to the Path A qualifying play-offs, which also included Hungary, Iceland and Romania.

The draw put Bulgaria against Hungary in their first play-off match on their quest to qualify for a major competition since 2004. However, in front of limited number of home fans, Bulgaria fell 1–3 to Hungary, and was eliminated from the tournament.

2020−21 Nations League
After appointing Georgi Dermendzhiev as their new head coach, Bulgaria began their brief promotion in League B. Being drawn into Group 4 with Wales, Finland and Republic of Ireland, Bulgaria played its first match against Ireland. A near victory for the Bulgarians until a 90th minute injury time equalizer sealed the draw for the Irish. Bulgaria would then play away to Wales, where they held the hosts leveled 0-0 until another 90th minute injury time goal that resulted in 0–1 loss. The problems would continue with another set of narrow losses to Finland and Wales, forcing Bulgaria to miss out on promotion to League A. With two more matches left, Bulgaria finished winless against Finland and Ireland, relegating the Lions to League C.

2022 World Cup qualification

Yasen Petrov was hired as the coach prior to the qualifiers for the 2022 World Cup. Bulgaria began the campaign horribly, losing at home 1–3 to Switzerland and 0–2 to Italy. The team somewhat improved in the next two games, drawing away at Northern Ireland and Italy, the reigning European champions. Bulgaria then beat Lithuania 1–0 at home, but lost 1–3 away against the same team, ending their hopes for qualification. A 2–1 home win against Northern Ireland was only a brief moment of rejoice before a heavy 0–4 defeat to Switzerland ended a largely miserable attempt for qualifying.

2022–23 UEFA Nations League

Bulgaria was allocated to League C for the League of Nations season, after relegation from the previous edition. Bulgaria's opponents were drawn to be North Macedonia, Georgia and Gibraltar. The campaign began with a 1–1 draw against North Macedonia at home, followed by a heavy 2–5 loss against Georgia at home. Yasen Petrov handed his resignation following the game. Georgi Ivanov was appointed as interim manager for the next two games against Gibraltar and Georgia. Another shameful performance followed, when the Lions drew 1–1 in Gibraltar, which was one of only few times that the Gibraltar national team had not lost a competitive game in its history. In Georgia, Bulgaria drew 0–0, extending the winless streak to four games. During the one month pause of the tournament, Serbian Mladen Krstajić was appointed as manager. Under his reins, Bulgaria recorded two wins against Gibraltar at home and North Macedonia away, eventually finishing second in the group. The game against North Macedonia was particularly intense, due to rising political tensions between the two countries at that time. The Bulgarian national anthem was heavily booed, followed by multiple provocations from both Macedonian fans and players aimed at the Bulgarian team.

Team image
Bulgaria's traditional colours are white, green and red, taken from the colours of the country's flag. This tricolour is reflected through the use of white shirts, green shorts, and red socks. The team's away kits have usually been red.

Their nickname is The Lions, in tribute of the lions represented in the coat of arms of Bulgaria.

Colours

Kit sponsorship

Ultras and controversy

In recent years, ultras of the Bulgarian team have developed a reputation for racism. After racist chanting and monkey noises directed at Ashley Young, Ashley Cole and Theo Walcott during a qualifier for Euro 2012, the Bulgarian Football Union was fined €40,000 by UEFA. The BFU denied that racism would be an issue during Euro 2020 qualifiers, claiming that the issue was worse in England. Nevertheless, Bulgarian ultras were accused of racist chants during their matches against Czech Republic, Kosovo and England. As a result, part of the Bulgarian stadium was closed off for the match against England (October 2019), and officials twice halted the game under the UEFA anti-racism protocol. In the following days since the match took place, Bulgarian police identified 15 fans they suspected were responsible for subjecting black English players including Raheem Sterling, Marcus Rashford and Tyrone Mings to racist abuse, arresting six of them.

UEFA president Aleksander Ceferin condemned the alleged abuse calling on the "football family and governments" to "wage war on the racists". Disciplinary proceedings have been launched against both Bulgaria and England.

Home stadium
Traditionally, the Bulgarian national football team's home stadium is the Vasil Levski National Stadium with a capacity of 44,000. Vasil Levski was officially opened in 1953 and reconstructed in 1966 and 2002. It is the second largest stadium in Bulgaria, behind the Plovdiv Stadium with a capacity of 55,000. During the 2006–07 UEFA Champions League, the stadium was used for Levski Sofia matches with Barcelona, Chelsea, and Werder Bremen. Similarly, Ludogorets Razgrad used it as their main home venue for their European matches until the 2017–18 season. The Bulgarian national team's home matches and the Bulgarian Cup finals are held at the venue, as well as athletics competitions.

Lately, the national team is playing its home matches at the Huvepharma Arena in Razgrad, home of 11-time Bulgarian champions Ludogorets Razgrad. Opened in 1954 and renovated in 2011, the stadium has a capacity of 10,422.

Results and fixtures

2022

2023

Coaching staff

Coaching history

 Leopold Nitsch (1922–1924)
 Willibald Stejskal (1925–1926)
 Pavel Grozdanov (1927–1930)
 Carl Nemes (1930–1931)
  Otto Feist (1931–1932)
 Pavel Grozdanov (1932–1933)
 Károly Fogl (1934–1935)
 Nikola Kalkandzhiev (1935–1936)
 Ivan Batandzhiev (1936)
 Geno Mateev (1936–1937)
 Stanislav Toms (1937–1938)
 Kostantin Maznikov (1938–1939)
 Ivan Radoev (1939–1940)
 Franz Köhler (1940–1941)
 Ivan Radoev (1941–1942)
 Ivan Batandzhiev (1943–1945)
 Todor Konov (1945–1946)
 Mihail Manov (1947)
 Ivan Radoev (1947)
 Rezső Somlai (1947–1948)
 Lubomir Angelov (1948)
  Andor Haidu (1948–1949)
 Ivan Radoev (1950)
 Lubomir Angelov (1950)
  Andor Haidú (1950)
 Lubomir Angelov (1950–1953)
 Stoyan Ormandzhiev (1950–1953)
 Krum Milev (1954–1960)
 Georgi Pachedzhiev (1955–1962)
 Stoyan Ormandzhiev (1963)
 Béla Volentik (1963–1965)
 Rudolf Vytlačil (1965–1966)
 Dobromir Tashkov (1966–1967)
 Stefan Bozhkov (1967–1970)
 Vasil Spasov (1970–1972)
 Hristo Mladenov (1972–1974)
 Stoyan Ormandzhiev (1974–1977)
 Tsvetan Ilchev (1978–1980)
 Atanas Purzhelov (1980–1982)
 Ivan Vutsov (1982–1986)
 Hristo Mladenov (1986–1987)
 Boris Angelov (1988–1989)
 Ivan Vutsov (1989–1991)
 Dimitar Penev (1991–1996)
 Hristo Bonev (1996–1998)
 Dimitar Dimitrov (1998–1999)
 Stoycho Mladenov (2000–2001)
 Plamen Markov (2002–2004)
 Hristo Stoichkov (2004–2007)
 Stanimir Stoilov (2007)
 Dimitar Penev (2007)
 Plamen Markov (2007–2008)
 Stanimir Stoilov (2009–2010) 
 Lothar Matthäus (2010–2011)
 Mihail Madanski (2011)
 Lyuboslav Penev (2011–2014)
 Ivaylo Petev (2015–2016)
 Petar Hubchev (2016–2019)
 Krasimir Balakov (2019)
 Georgi Dermendzhiev (2019–2020)
 Yasen Petrov (2021–2022)
 Georgi Ivanov (2022)
 Mladen Krstajić (2022−)

Players

Current squad
The following players were called up for the UEFA Euro 2024 qualifying games against Montenegro and Hungary on 24 and 27 March 2023.

Caps and goals as of 20 November 2022, after the match against Luxembоurg.

Recent call-ups
The following players have also been called up to the Bulgarian squad within the last 12 months and are still available for selection.

INJ Player withdrew from the current squad due to injury.
COVID Player withdrew from the current squad due to testing positively for COVID-19 or having to self-isolate because of it.
U21 Not part of the squad due to U-21 call up.
PRE Preliminary squad.
RET Player had announced retirement from international football.
SUS Player is serving a suspension.
PRI Player absent due to private circumstances.
WD Withdrawn.

Player records

Players in bold text are still active with Bulgaria.

Most appearances

Top goalscorers

Competitive record

FIFA World Cup

 Champions   Runners-up   Third place   Fourth place  

*Draws include knockout matches decided on penalty kicks.

UEFA European Championship

*Draws include knockout matches decided on penalty kicks.

UEFA Nations League

*Draws include knockout matches decided on penalty kicks.

Olympic Games

Balkan Cup

*Competition abandoned with Bulgaria in third place.

Head-to-head record
As of 20 November 2022 after the match against .

Ranking history

 FIFA-ranking yearly averages for Bulgaria (1992–2022)

Honours
This is a list of honours for the senior Bulgaria national team

 FIFA World Cup:
 Fourth place (1): 1994
 Olympic Games:
  Runners-up (1): 1968
  Third place (1): 1956
 Balkan Cup:
  Champions (3): 1931, 1932, 1976
  Runners-up (2): 1935, 1936
  Third place (2): 1933, 1980
 Fourth place (4): 1930, 1934, 1946, 1947

See also

 Bulgaria national under-21 football team
 Bulgaria national under-19 football team
 Bulgaria national under-18 football team
 Bulgaria national under-17 football team

Notes

References

External links

Official website 
Bulgaria at FIFA site
Bulgaria at UEFA site
Bulgarian football – history, teams, stadiums, fan clubs
RSSSF archive of results 1924–
RSSSF archive of most capped players and highest goalscorers
Planet World Cup archive of results in the World Cup
Planet World Cup archive of squads in the World Cup
Planet World Cup archive of results in the World Cup qualifiers

 
European national association football teams
Football in Bulgaria
1922 establishments in Bulgaria
National sports teams established in 1922